Andreas Beutler (born January 26, 1963) is a retired professional ice hockey defender. He spent the majority of his career with SC Bern in the National League A and won three NLA championships with the team in 1989, 1991 and 1992. After retiring he became a coach and has coached several teams in the Swiss lower leagues.

Achievements 
1989 - NLA Champion with SC Bern
1991 - NLA Champion with SC Bern
1992 - NLA Champion with SC Bern

International play 
Andreas Beutler participated in the following tournaments for the Swiss national team:

 1 A-World Championships: 1991
 1 Olympic Games: 1992 in Albertville

External links 

1963 births
Living people
EHC Basel players
Ice hockey players at the 1992 Winter Olympics
Olympic ice hockey players of Switzerland
SC Bern players
SCL Tigers players
Swiss ice hockey defencemen